The 2018 FIVB Volleyball Women's World Championship qualification  is a series of tournaments to decide teams which will play in the 2018 FIVB Volleyball Women's World Championship. The 2018 World Championship will feature 24 teams. Two places were allocated to the hosts, Japan and the titleholder, United States. The remaining 22 places will be determined by a qualification process in which entrants from among the other teams from the five FIVB confederations will compete.

Qualified teams
 

{| class="wikitable sortable"
|-
! rowspan=2 style="width:150px;"|Country
! rowspan=2 style="width:100px;"|Confederation
! rowspan=2 style="width:280px;"|Qualified as
! rowspan=2 style="width:110px;"|Qualified on
! colspan=3 |Previous appearances
|-
! Total
! First
! Last
|-
| 
| AVC
| Host Country
|  25 August 2014
|align=center| 15 
|align=center| 1960
|align=center| 2014
|-
| 
| NORCECA
| Defending Champions
|  12 October 2014
|align=center| 15 
|align=center| 1956
|align=center| 2014
|-
| 1
| CEV
| CEV Second Round Pool B Winners
|  28 May 2017
|align=center| 4 
|align=center| 1978
|align=center| 2014
|-
| 2
| CEV
| CEV Second Round Pool A Winners
|  3 June 2017
|align=center| 16 
|align=center| 1952
|align=center| 2014
|-
| 
| CEV
| CEV Second Round Pool E Winners
|  3 June 2017
|align=center| 3 
|align=center| 1994
|align=center| 2014
|-
| 
| CEV
| CEV Second Round Pool C Winners
|  4 June 2017
|align=center| 3 
|align=center| 2006
|align=center| 2014
|-
| 
| CEV
| CEV Second Round Pool D Winners
|  4 June 2017
|align=center| 10 
|align=center| 1978
|align=center| 2014
|-
| 3
| CEV
| CEV Second Round Pool F Winners
|  4 June 2017
|align=center| 15 
|align=center| 1956
|align=center| 2014
|-
| 
| CSV
| CSV Championship Winners
|  19 August 2017
|align=center| 15
|align=center| 1956
|align=center| 2014
|-
| 
| CEV
| CEV Third Round Pool G Winners
|  26 August 2017
|align=center| 13
|align=center| 1956
|align=center| 2014
|-
| 
| CEV
| CEV Third Round Pool G Runners-up
|  26 August 2017
|align=center| 11
|align=center| 1952
|align=center| 2014
|-
| 
| AVC
| AVC Second Round Pool A Winners
|  23 September 2017
|align=center| 13
|align=center| 1956
|align=center| 2014
|-
| 
| AVC
| AVC Second Round Pool B Winners
|  23 September 2017
|align=center| 11
|align=center| 1967
|align=center| 2010
|-
| 
| AVC
| 
|  23 September 2017
|align=center| 4
|align=center| 1998
|align=center| 2014
|-
| 
| AVC
| AVC Second Round Pool A Runners-up
|  24 September 2017
|align=center| 3
|align=center| 2006
|align=center| 2014
|-
| 
| NORCECA
| NORCECA Championship Pool B Winners
|  29 September 2017
|align=center| 8
|align=center| 1974
|align=center| 2014
|-
| 
| NORCECA
| 
|  
|align=center| 12
|align=center| 1970
|align=center| 2014
|-
| 
| CAVB
| CAVB Championship Winners
|  13 October 2017
|align=center| 2
|align=center| 2006
|align=center| 2014
|-
| 
| CAVB
| CAVB Championship Runners-up
|  13 October 2017
|align=center| 5
|align=center| 1994
|align=center| 2010
|-
| 
| NORCECA
| NORCECA Championship Pool A Winners
|  14 October 2017
|align=center| 7
|align=center| 1974
|align=center| 2014
|-
| 
| NORCECA
| NORCECA Championship Pool C Winners
|  14 October 2017
|align=center| 7
|align=center| 1970
|align=center| 2014
|-
| 
| NORCECA
| NORCECA Championship Pool A Runners-up
|  14 October 2017
|align=center| 6
|align=center| 1974
|align=center| 2014
|-
| 
| NORCECA
| 
|  14 October 2017
|align=center| 0
|align=center| –
|align=center| –
|-
| 
| CSV
| CSV Qualifier Winners
|  15 October 2017
|align=center| 5
|align=center| 1960
|align=center| 2014
|}

Notes
1 Competed as SFR Yugoslavia in 1978 and as Serbia and Montenegro (FR Yugoslavia) in 2006; 3rd appearance as Serbia.
2 Competed as Soviet Union from 1952 to 1990; 7th appearance as Russia.
3 Competed separately as East and West Germany from 1956 to 1990; 7th appearance as Unified Germany.

Qualification process
The distribution by confederation for the 2018 FIVB Volleyball Women's World Championship will be:

 Asia and Oceania (AVC): 4 places (Japan qualified automatically as host nations for a total of 5 places)
 Africa (CAVB): 2 places
 Europe (CEV): 8 places 
 South America (CSV): 2 places
 North America (NORCECA): 6 places (United States qualified automatically as the reigning champions for a total of 7 places)

Summary of qualification

Note: AVC total includes +1 for Japan as hosts.
Note: NORCECA total includes +1 for United States as reigning champions.

Pool standing procedure
 Number of matches won
 Match points
 Sets ratio
 Points ratio
 Result of the last match between the tied teams

Match won 3–0 or 3–1: 3 match points for the winner, 0 match points for the loser.
Match won 3–2: 2 match points for the winner, 1 match point for the loser.

NORCECA only
Match won 3–0: 5 match points for the winner, 0 match points for the loser
Match won 3–1: 4 match points for the winner, 1 match point for the loser
Match won 3–2: 3 match points for the winner, 2 match points for the loser

Confederation qualification

AVC (Asia and Oceania)

Format
First round: The bottom ranked teams of Asia were divided into three groups of three zonal association. The group winners advanced to the second round of FIVB World Championship qualification.
Second round: A total of 10 teams (teams ranked 1–7 and three first round winners) were divided into two groups of five teams. The top two teams of each group qualified for the 2018 FIVB World Championship.

Teams

  (second round)
  (second round → Qualified)
  (second round)
  (first round → Second Round)
  (first round → Second Round)
  (second round → Qualified)
  (first round)
  (first round)
  (first round → Second Round)
  (second round → Qualified)
  (second round → Qualified)
  (second round)

Withdrawal
  (First Round)
  (First Round)
  (First Round)
  (First Round)
  (First Round)
Suspension
  (First Round)

Final positions (second round)

The draw for the second round was held on 19 March 2017, at the Dusit Princess Srinakarin Hotel in Bangkok, Thailand.

CAVB (Africa)

Format
First round: The bottom ranked tean of Africa were divided into seven groups of seven zonal association, later six groups of six zonal association. The group winners and runners-up advanced to the second round of FIVB World Championship qualification and CAVB Championship in Cameroon.
Second round (CAVB Championship): A total of 13 teams (hosts, teams ranked 1–2 of Africa, nine first round winners and two wildcard teams), later 9 teams were divided into two groups. The top two teams of each group advanced to the play-offs. The winners of play-offs will qualified for the 2018 FIVB World Championship.

Teams

  (first round → CAVB Championship)
  (first round → CAVB Championship)
  (CAVB Championship → Qualified)
  (first round → CAVB Championship)
  (first round → CAVB Championship)
  (first round → CAVB Championship)
  (first round → CAVB Championship)
  (first round)
  (CAVB Championship → Qualified)
  (first round → CAVB Championship)
  (first round → CAVB Championship)
  (first round)
  (first round → CAVB Championship)
  (first round)
  (first round → CAVB Championship)
  (first round)

Withdrawal

  (First Round)
  (CAVB Championship)
  (First Round)
  (First Round)
  (First Round)
  (First Round)
  (First Round)
  (First Round)
  (First Round)
  (First Round)
  (First Round)
  (First Round)
  (First Round)
  (First Round)
  (First Round)
  (CAVB Championship)
  (First Round)

Final positions (CAVB Championship)

Preliminary round

Play-offs
Winners qualified for 2018 World Championship

|}

CEV (Europe)

Teams

  (second round)
  (second round → Qualified)
  (second round → Third Round)
  (second round)
  (second round)
  (second round → Third Round → Qualified)
  (second round)
  ((first round → Second Round)
  (second round → Third Round)
  (second round)
  (second round)
  (first round)
  (second round)
  (second round)
  (second round)
  (second round  → Qualified)
  (second round → Third Round)
  (second round)
  (first round)
  ((first round → Second Round)
  (second round)
  (second round → Qualified)
  (second round)
  (second round)
  (first round)
  (first round)
  (second round)
  (second round → Third Round  → Qualified)
  (first round)
  (second round)
  (second round)
  (second round)
  (second round)
  (second round → Qualified)
  (first round)
  (second round → Qualified)
  (second round)
  (second round → Third Round)
  (second round)
  (second round)
  (second round → Qualified)
  (second round)

Final positions (second round)

Third round

CSV (South America)

Teams

  (CSV Championship → CSV Qualifier → Qualified)
  (CSV Championship → Qualified)
  (CSV Championship)
  (CSV Championship → CSV Qualifier)
  (CSV Championship → CSV Qualifier)
  (CSV Qualifier)
  (CSV Championship)

Final positions (CSV Championship)

CSV Qualifier

NORCECA

Teams

  (first round)
  (first round → Second Round)
  (first round)
  (first round → Second Round)
  (first round)
  (first round → Second Round)
  (first round)
  (first round)
  (NORCECA Championship → Qualified)
  (first round)
  (NORCECA Championship)
  (NORCECA Championship → Qualified)
  (first round → Second Round)
  (second round → NORCECA Championship)
  (NORCECA Championship → Qualified)
  (first round)
  (first round → Second Round)
  (first round → Second Round)
  (first round → NORCECA Championship)
  (second round → NORCECA Championship)
  (first round)
  (first round)
  (first round → Second Round)
  (NORCECA Championship → Qualified)
  (first round → NORCECA Championship)
  (first round)
  (NORCECA Championship → Qualified)
  (first round)
  (first round → Second Round)
  (second round → NORCECA Championship)
  (first round → Second Round)
  (first round )
  (first round)
  (first round → Second Round)
  (first round → Second Round)
  (second round → NORCECA Championship → Qualified)
  (first round)
  (first round → Second Round)

Final positions (NORCECA Continental Championship)

References

External links

2018 FIVB Volleyball Women's World Championship
FIVB Volleyball Women's World Championship qualification